Rundle College Society is a not for profit organization operating three schools in Calgary, Alberta. Rundle College was founded in 1985 and provides education for more than 1150 students from kindergarten through Grade 12. Rundle's class sizes are small (typically 12–14 students).

Facilities
Rundle College Society Operates Three Campuses in the Calgary Area:
Rundle College Primary & Elementary ("W.C. Collett School" for Preschool to Grade 6)
Rundle College Junior/Senior High ("R.C. Conklin School" for Grade 7 to Grade 12)
Rundle Academy (Grade 4 – Grade 12, for students with a diagnosed learning disability)

See also
 Rundle College Jr/Sr High School
 Rundle College Primary/Elementary School

References

External links
Rundle College Society
Rundle College Primary
Rundle College Elementary
Rundle College Jr/Sr High School
Rundle College Academy

Middle schools in Calgary
High schools in Calgary
1985 establishments in Alberta